Wadi Koura is a wadi located west of Ain Ebel in the Bint Jbeil District of Nabatieh Governorate in Lebanon.

A Heavy Neolithic archaeological site of the Qaraoun culture was located in the area where an outlet of the Wadi Yaroun flows from north to south in the direction of Debel. Materials were found on the site by Henri Fleisch and were stored with the Saint Joseph University (now the Museum of Lebanese Prehistory). Along with an assemblage of well rolled Heavy Neolithic tools, a few Acheulian pieces were found, both on the bed and around the banks of the wadi.

References

Bint Jbeil District
Archaeological sites in Lebanon
Heavy Neolithic sites
Neolithic settlements